Jacob Vandsø Ryfeldt Rasmussen (born 28 May 1997) is a Danish professional footballer who plays as a centre-back for Eredivisie club Feyenoord, on loan from Fiorentina.

Club career

Early career
Born in Odense, Rasmussen began his youth career at age five for Næsby Boldklub before moving to the youth academy of Superliga club Odense Boldklub (OB) in 2013. He signed with the Schalke 04 academy in September 2014.

FC St. Pauli II
After spending two seasons in the academy he signed for FC St. Pauli in June 2016. He became part of the reserve team, competing in Regionalliga. On 31 July he made his debut for the side, starting in the 3–1 win over 1. FC Germania Egestorf/Langreder. In the return game against Egestorf/Langreder on 26 November, he scored his first goal for the team and thereby contributed to the 3–3 away draw.

He was part of the first-team squad twice, but only sat on the bench for matches against SV Sandhausen and VfL Bochum.

Rosenborg
On 6 January 2017, Rasmussen signed for Eliteserien club Rosenborg. He made his debut 29 March 2017 starting against Brann in the 2017 Mesterfinalen. On 5 April he made his debut in Eliteserien, starting in the 3–0 victory at Sandefjord.

Empoli
On 5 July 2018, Empoli announced that they had signed Rasmussen on a four-year contract. He made his debut on 12 August in the Coppa Italia tie against Cittadella, which was lost 3–0. Seven days later he also made his debut in Serie A, in the 2–0 win over Cagliari.

Fiorentina
On 31 January 2019, Rasmussen joined Fiorentina. He was sent directly to his former club Empoli on loan for the remainder of the 2018–19 season.

Erzgebirge Aue (loan)
On 12 January 2020, he joined 2. Bundesliga club Erzgebirge Aue on loan for the rest of the 2019–20 season. He made his debut on 31 January in a 0–0 draw against league leaders Arminia Bielefeld.

Vitesse (loan)
On 21 July 2020, Rasmussen was loaned to Dutch Eredivisie club Vitesse for the 2020–21 season, with the option of extending the loan for another season. During the season, Vitesse reached the final of the KNVB Cup, but lost 2–1 to Ajax. Rasmussen was sent off in the cup final. A month later, the option in his loan deal was triggered, and his deal was extended by another season.

On 4 November 2021, Rasmussen scored a goal and an own goal in the span of four minutes in the UEFA Europa Conference League match against Tottenham Hotspur, coached by Antonio Conte in his debut as manager of the club. The match ended in a 3–2 loss for the Dutch side.

Feyenoord (loan)
On 30 July 2022, Rasmussen returned to the Netherlands and joined Feyenoord on a season-long loan with an option to buy. He made his competitive debut for the club on the first matchday of the 2022–23 season, starting at centre-back against his former club Vitesse in a 5–2 victory. On 27 August, he scored his first goal for the club, slotting home the third goal in the club's 4–0 win over FC Emmen.

Career statistics

Honours
Rosenborg
Eliteserien: 2017, 2018  
Mesterfinalen: 2017, 2018

References

External links

 

1997 births
Living people
Footballers from Odense
Danish men's footballers
Næsby Boldklub players
Odense Boldklub players
FC Schalke 04 players
FC St. Pauli players
FC St. Pauli II players
Rosenborg BK players
Empoli F.C. players
ACF Fiorentina players
FC Erzgebirge Aue players
SBV Vitesse players
Feyenoord players
Regionalliga players
Eliteserien players
Serie A players
2. Bundesliga players
Eredivisie players
Danish expatriate men's footballers
Expatriate footballers in Germany
Danish expatriate sportspeople in Germany
Expatriate footballers in Norway
Danish expatriate sportspeople in Norway
Expatriate footballers in Italy
Danish expatriate sportspeople in Italy
Expatriate footballers in the Netherlands
Danish expatriate sportspeople in the Netherlands
Denmark youth international footballers
Denmark under-21 international footballers
Association football defenders